Emile Touma (Arabic: إميل توما, Hebrew: אמיל תומא, March 16, 1919 – Aug. 27, 1985), was a Palestinian and Israeli Arab political historian, journalist and theorist.

Emile was born in Haifa to a wealthy Orthodox Christian family in 1919. He attended the Orthodox School in Haifa, then went to Jerusalem to the St. George's School to complete his high school studies. He enrolled in Cambridge University but left it in 1939 when World War II started. In that year he joined the Palestine Communist Party. In 1944 Touma, Fuad Nassar and Emile Habibi established a new newspaper, Al-Ittihad, which published its first edition on 14 May 1944.

In January 1947 Touma travelled to a conference of Communist parties of the British Empire in London, where he argued against partition of Palestine. He was arrested in Lebanon in 1948. In 1949 he returned to Haifa and continued working as editor-in-chief of Al-Ittihad. In 1965 he joined the eastrization foundation in Moscow where he got his PhD in History for his dissertation on Arab nationalism,  "The March of the Arab Peoples and the Problems of Arab Unity" ("مسيرة الشعوب العربية ومشاكل الوحدة العربية")

In 1942, along with Dr. Haidar Abdel-Shafi, and the late Mukhlis Amer, Habibi and Mufid Nashashibi, Touma was a founder of the Palestinian National Liberation League. He wrote 15 books and hundreds of articles about politics, history and culture.

He was married to Chaia Karberg, an Israeli ceramic artist of Moldovan-Jewish background.

Commemoration
The Emil Touma Institute for Palestinian and Israeli Studies, established in 1986, is named for him. 
In 2004 a street was named for him in Haifa's Wadi Nisnas.

References

External links
Touma's biography at Institute for Palestinian and Israeli Studies

1919 births
1985 deaths
Writers from Haifa
20th-century Palestinian historians
National Liberation League in Palestine politicians
Palestinian communists
Israeli communists
Israeli people of Palestinian descent
Arab citizens of Israel
Israeli newspaper editors
Israeli Christian socialists
 Palestinian Christian socialists